Ohangam is a village in tehsil Beerwah of district Budgam of the Jammu and Kashmir. its population is about 3500. The famous Kashmiri poet and the author of  Kashmiri folktale Heemal Nagrai,  Waliullah Mattu is from the same village. The shrine of famous sufi saint Baba Hanief Ud Din Reshi is lacated in the North East of Ohangam.

See also 
 Chewdara
 Rathsoon
 Aripanthan
 Sonapah
 Wanihama
 Meerpora
 Beerwah
 Arwah

References

External links 

Villages in Budgam district